Lakhvinder Singh Rana (born 13 June 1968) is an Indian businessman and politician who has served in the Himachal Pradesh Legislative Assembly for two non-consecutive terms, representing the Nalagarh Assembly constituency from 2011 to 2012 and since 2017. Originally elected as a member of the Indian National Congress, Rana defected to the Bharatiya Janata Party in August 2022.

Early life and career 
Rana was born on 13 June 1968 in the village of Joghon, Nalagarh in Himachal Pradesh. Rana attended the Govt. Degree College Nalagarh and Himachal Pradesh University, graduating with a Bachelor of Arts degree in 1988. In 1992, Rana became the director of the Himachal Pradesh Cooperative and Rural Development Bank, serving until 1997. The following year, he became a board member of the Himachal Pradesh Small Saving Bank, holding that position until 2003.

Political career 
Rana's political career began in 1990, when he began serving in his local panchayat samiti as a member of the Bharatiya Janata Party, later also serving in the Solan district's Zila Parishad. From 1996 to 1997, Rana was a member of Akhil Bharatiya Vidyarthi Parishad, a right-wing student organisation. In 1997, Rana became the state president of the Bharatiya Janata Yuva Morcha, serving until 1998, when he became the president of the Nalagarh BJP. From 2000 until 2003, Rana was the BJP district president in the Solan district.

In 2005, Rana left the BJP and switched his party affiliation to the Indian National Congress. In the 2007 Himachal Pradesh Legislative Assembly election, Rana stood as a candidate for the Himachal Pradesh Legislative Assembly, running as the INC nominee for the Nalagarh Assembly constituency, which was a BJP stronghold. Rana was defeated by BJP incumbent Hari Naraian Singh, receiving 25,108 votes compared to Singh's 28,929. In 2008, he served as the INC spokesman for the Solan district, and from 2008 until 2022, he served as a member of the Himachal Congress Executive Committee. He also served as the vice president of the state party.

Tenure in the legislative assembly 
Following Singh's death in office in 2011, Rana stood as a candidate in the by-election to replace him. Rana narrowly defeated Gurnam Kaur of the BJP, receiving 28,799 votes compared to Kaur's 27,200. The following year, Rana ran for a full term in the 2012 Himachal Pradesh Legislative Assembly election; however, he was defeated by BJP nominee Krishan Lal Thakur, receiving 26,033 votes compared to Thakur's 35,341. In the 2017 Himachal Pradesh Legislative Assembly election, Rana narrowly defeated Thakur in a rematch, receiving 25,872 votes compared to Thakur's 24,630. 

During his tenure in the legislative assembly, Rana has advocated for the improvement of infrastructure in Nalagarh, which is an industrial hub. Rana has supported the re-opening an old colonial-era railway line that connects to Nalagarh from the town of Ghanauli in Punjab, and has claimed that the state has not sufficiently incentivized industrialists to operate in the area.

On 17 August 2022, Rana and Pawan Kumar Kajal, the working president of the state party, both defected and joined the BJP. The following day, the pair were officially expelled from the INC and were barred from re-joining for six years. The defection of the two senior Congress officials was deemed to be a major blow to the party just a few months prior to the 2022 Himachal Pradesh Legislative Assembly election.

Electoral performance

References 

1968 births
Living people
People from Solan district
Himachal Pradesh University alumni
20th-century Indian businesspeople
21st-century Indian businesspeople
20th-century Indian politicians
21st-century Indian politicians
Bharatiya Janata Party politicians from Himachal Pradesh
Former members of Indian National Congress from Himachal Pradesh
Himachal Pradesh MLAs 2007–2012
Himachal Pradesh MLAs 2017–2022